Enoch Eli "Bud" Olsen III (July 25, 1940 – March 12, 2018) was an American professional basketball player.

A 6'8" center from the University of Louisville, Olsen was selected by the Cincinnati Royals in the second round of the 1962 NBA draft. He played seven seasons in the NBA with the Royals, San Francisco Warriors, Seattle SuperSonics, Boston Celtics, and Detroit Pistons, averaging 4.3 points and 3.0 rebounds per game. He spent the 1969–70 season with the Kentucky Colonels of the American Basketball Association.

Olsen died on March 12, 2018.

Notes

1940 births
2018 deaths
American men's basketball players
Basketball players from Dayton, Ohio
Boston Celtics players
Centers (basketball)
Cincinnati Royals draft picks
Cincinnati Royals players
Detroit Pistons players
Kentucky Colonels players
Louisville Cardinals men's basketball players
Milwaukee Bucks expansion draft picks
San Francisco Warriors players
Seattle SuperSonics expansion draft picks
Seattle SuperSonics players